was a Japanese daimyō of the Edo period, who ruled the Akō Domain. He was classified as a tozama, and Akō under his rule was 53,000 koku in size. Naganao was responsible for the construction of Akō Castle.

|-

References
This article is derived from corresponding content on the Japanese Wikipedia.

1610 births
1672 deaths
Daimyo
Asano clan